Joseph Kingsbury may refer to:

 Joseph C. Kingsbury (1812–1888), Mormon pioneer
 Joseph T. Kingsbury (1853–1937), president of the University of Deseret
 Joseph Kingsbury (Dedham), an early settler of Dedham, Massachusetts